Collin Schlee is an American football quarterback for the UCLA Bruins. He previously played for Kent State.

Early life and high school
Schlee grew up in Ijamsville, Maryland and attended Oakdale High School, where he played football and basketball. He passed for 1,503 yards and 23 touchdowns as a senior. Schlee committed to play college football at Kent State.

College career
Schlee redshirted his true freshman season with the Kent State Golden Flashes. He spent his redshirt freshman season as the backup to starter Dustin Crum. Schlee continued as Crum's backup as a redshirt sophomore and played in ten games, 17-of-24 pass attempts for 238 yards and one touchdown and also rushing for 127 yards and three touchdowns. He was named the Golden Flashes' starting quarterback entering his redshirt junior season. Schlee completed 157-of-266 passes for 2,109 yards with 13 touchdowns and five interceptions while also rushing for 489 yards and four touchdowns. Following the end of the season, he entered the NCAA transfer portal.

Schlee ultimately transferred to UCLA.

References

External links
Kent State Golden Flashes bio

Living people
Players of American football from Maryland
American football quarterbacks
Kent State Golden Flashes football players
UCLA Bruins football players
Year of birth missing (living people)